was a Japanese actor best known for his role as Gorobei in Akira Kurosawa's Seven Samurai. In addition to his career in film, Inaba was also a prolific theater actor and a member of the prestigious Haiyuza Theatre Company. He died of a heart attack at the age of 77.

Filmography

Film

 Umi no hanabi (1951)
 Wakare-gumo (1951)
 Seven Samurai (1954) - Gorobei Katayama
 Horafuki tanji (1954) - Escaped Prisoner Iwagorō
  (1955) - Mijagi
 Samurai II: Duel at Ichijoji Temple (続宮本武蔵　一乗寺の決闘 Zoku Miyamoto Musashi: Ichijōji no kettō) (1955)
 Uruwashiki haha (1955) - Shigematsu
 Shujinsen (1956)
 Arashi (1956) - Detective of the special political police
 Mitsu-kubi-tou (1956) - Shōshichi Kitō
 Throne of Blood (1957) - Third Military Commander
 Ninjitsu (1957)
 Jun'ai Monogatari (1957) - Doctor at Nisseki Hospital
 Ballad of the Cart (1959) - Fujitaro
 Fires on the Plain (1959)
 Fujimi no otoko (1960)
 Haru no yume (1960) - Yamada
 Matsukawa-Jiken (1961)
 Gokai senryo yari (1961) - Shibata
 Kutsukake Tokijirō (1961) - Shōten
 Otoko to otoko no ikiru machi (1962) - Shizuo Iwasaki
 Woman of Design (1962) - Yasuda
 Destiny's Son (1962) - Giichirō Ikebe
 Harakiri (1962) - Jinai Chijiiwa
 Zoku rokunin shimai (1962)
 Yōsō (1963)
 Shikonmado - Dai tatsumaki (1964) - Ronin (uncredited)
 Ken (1964) - Seiichiro Kokubun
 Kōge - Nibu: Mitsumata no shō (1964)
 The Great Killing (1964)
 Nemuri Kyōshirō: Joyōken (1964) - Bizen-ya the Merchant
 Samurai Assassin (1965) - Keijiro Sumita
 Sleepy Eyes of Death: Sword of Satan (1965) - Mizuno
 Taiheiyō kiseki no sakusen: Kisuka (1965) - Tamai
 Kemonomichi (1965)
 The Guardman: Tokyo yōjimbō (1965) - Yoshida
 Gohiki no shinshi (1966)
 Onna no naka ni iru tanin (1966)
 The Guardman: Tokyo Ninja Butai (1966) - Yoshida
 Hikinige (1966)
 Ichiman sanzennin (1966)
 Rikugun Nakano gakko: Ryu-sango shirei (1967)
 Chichi to ko: Zoku Na mo naku mazushiku utsukushiku (1967)
 Nemuri Kyōshirō burai-hikae: Mashō no hada (1967)
 Rengō kantai shirei chōkan: Yamamoto Isoroku (1968) - Chief of Staff Ugaki
 Battle of the Japan Sea (1969) - Chief of Staff Officer Shimamura
 Kage no kuruma (1970)
 Wakamono no hata (1970)
 Stray Cat Rock: Beat '71 (1971) - Yoshitarō Araki
 Silence (1971) - Prisoner official
 Shinobu-ito (1973)
 Yajū gari (1973) - Onimaru
 Kaseki (1974)
 Karei-naru Ichizoku (1974) - Ichinose Factory's owner
 Castle of Sand (1974) - Search chief clerk
 Koi wa midori no kaze no naka (1974)
 Shōwa karesusuki (1975)
 Gokumon-tō (1977) - Village Mayor Makihei Araki
 Village of Eight Gravestones (1977) - Ochimusha
 Mitsuyaku: Gaimushō kimitsu rōei jiken (1978) - Nakada
 Kumokiri Nizaemon (1978) - Seizō
 Nihon no don: kanketsuhen (1978) - Satomi
 Mito Kōmon (1978) - Kihei
 Blue Christmas (1978)
 The Battle of Port Arthur (1980) - Ijichi Kōsuke
 Willful Murder (1981) - Horii
 Matagi (1982) - Kokichi Suzuki
 The Challenge (1982) - Instructor
 Battle Anthem (1983) - Kamimura
 Shōsetsu Yoshida Gakkō (1983)
 Keiji monogatari 2 - Ringo no uta (1983) - Kenzo Tashiro
 Yōkirō (1983)
 Kita no hotaru (1984) - Bessho (final film role)

Television
 Taikōki (1965) as Katō Kiyotada
 Daichūshingura (1971) as Kajikawa Yoriteru
 Amigasa Jūbei (1974–75)
 Tōge no Gunzō (1982) as Inakichi

References

External links
 
 

1920 births
1998 deaths
People from Narita, Chiba
Actors from Chiba Prefecture
20th-century Japanese male actors